The 2015–16 Colgate Raiders women's basketball team represented Colgate University during the 2015–16 NCAA Division I women's basketball season. The Raiders, led by fifth year head coach Nicci Hays Fort, played their home games at Cotterell Court and were members of the Patriot League. They finished the season 7–23, 4–14 in Patriot League play to finish in a tie for eighth place. They advanced to the quarterfinals of the Patriot League women's tournament where they lost to Army.

On March 10, 2016, head coach Nicci Hays Fort has resigned. She finished at Colgate with a five year record of 42–110.

Roster

Schedule

|-
!colspan=9 style="background:#800000; color:#FFFFFF;"| Exhibition

|-
!colspan=9 style="background:#800000; color:#FFFFFF;"| Non-conference regular season

|-
!colspan=9 style="background:#800000; color:#FFFFFF;"| Patriot League regular season

|-
!colspan=9 style="background:#800000; color:#FFFFFF;"| Patriot League Women's Tournament

See also
 2015–16 Colgate Raiders men's basketball team

References

Colgate
Colgate Raiders women's basketball seasons